St Roch United FC is a Seychelles based football club, they are playing in the Seychelles League.

The team is based in Bel Ombre, Seychelles in Mahe island.

Stadium
Currently, the team plays at the 10,000 capacity Stade Linité.

References

External links
Soccerway

Football clubs in Seychelles